The Skull Creek Shale is a Cretaceous geologic formation in Wyoming as well as Colorado and Nebraska, United States.

The Skull Creek Shale corresponds with the Kiowa Shale.

See also

 List of fossiliferous stratigraphic units in Colorado
 List of fossiliferous stratigraphic units in Nebraska
 List of fossiliferous stratigraphic units in Wyoming
 Paleontology in Colorado
 Paleontology in Nebraska
 Paleontology in Wyoming

References

Cretaceous Colorado
Cretaceous geology of Nebraska
Cretaceous geology of Wyoming